Karen Stanton is a British historian, academic and the current Vice Chancellor of Solent University.

Education 
Stanton holds a bachelor degree in history from University of Sheffield and a post graduate qualification in information science from Manchester Metropolitan University.

Career 
Stanton is the current Vice Chancellor of Solent University. She was previously Vice Chancellor of York St John University, deputy Vice Chancellor at Glasgow Caledonian University. She has previously held positions at Birmingham University, King's College London, Sheffield Hallam and Nottingham University.

Prior to her accession, she was chair of the cathedral's group and vice chair of GuildHE. She was responsible for GCU's overseas campuses in Bangladesh, Oman and New York, and was a member of the United Nations Alliance for United Kingdom. She also worked with BBC as a researcher.

References 

Alumni of the University of Sheffield
Alumni of Manchester Metropolitan University
Year of birth missing (living people)
Living people
People associated with York St John University
People associated with Solent University